The R386 is a Regional Route in South Africa that connects Carnarvon with Prieska.

External links
 Routes Travel Info

References

Regional Routes in the Northern Cape